The monthly magazine Šaraf (Persian: شرف; DMG: Šaraf; English: “dignity“) was published in Tehran between 1882 and 1891. Under the management of Mohammad Hasan Khan, Etemad-Saltaneh (1840–1895), a total of 87 issues in one volume was published. This magazine became famous for its numerous and elaborate illustrations and photographs.

Mohammad Hasan Khan was graduated from the well-known Dar al-Funun University of Technology and in Paris as a historian and geographer. He was at the same time minister of the cabinet of Naser-ed-Din Shah. For the illustrations of the magazine he employed the most famous calligraphers, painters and photographers. Their artworks complemented the biographies and portraits of famous Iranian and foreign notables, politicians and artists of that time, on their publication Sharaf was specialized. The magazine changed and revolutionized the art and painting of that time.

References

External links
 Online-Version: Šaraf
 Digital Collections: Arabische, persische und osmanisch-türkische Periodika

1882 establishments in Iran
1891 disestablishments in Iran
Defunct magazines published in Iran
Magazines established in 1882
Magazines disestablished in 1891
Magazines published in Tehran
Monthly magazines published in Iran
Persian-language magazines
Visual arts magazines